Denko is a 1993 short drama film directed by Guinean film maker Mohamed Camara. The story involves incest between a mother and son. The film won the Grand Prix at the Clermont-Ferrand International Short Film Festival, the award for Best Short film at the Fribourg International Film Festival and the Golden Danzante award at the Huesca Film Festival.

Synopsis
Mariama and her blind son Bilaly are shunned by their neighbours. When Mariama rescues an albino man, Samba, from drowning, she discovers that he is a healer and can cure her son's blindness. In order for him to do this, Mariama must commit incest with Bilaly.

References

External links

 Denko on the Africa Film Library

1993 short films
1993 films
1993 drama films
Guinean drama films
French short films
Guinean short films